Thorne Bay is a city in Prince of Wales-Hyder Census Area, Alaska, United States. As of the 2020 census the population was 476, up from 471 in 2010.

Geography 

Climate
The average temperature of Thorne Bay is 45 °F, which is much higher than the Alaska average temperature of 32 °F and is much lower than the national average temperature of 54 °F.

Demographics 

Thorne Bay first appeared on the 1890 census as the unincorporated settlement of "Tolstoi Bay." It had 17 residents, of which 13 were Native and 4 were White. It would not appear again until 1970 when it returned as Thorne Bay, also an unincorporated village. It was made a census-designated place (CDP) in 1980. It formally incorporated in 1982.

As of the census of 2000, there were 557 people and  219 households, including 157 families, residing in the city.  The population density was 541.8 people per square mile (8.4/km2).  There were 327 housing units at an average density of 12.8 per square mile (4.9/km2).  The racial makeup of the city was 92.46% Caucasian, 2.87% Alaska Native, 0.18% Pacific Islander, 0.54% from other races, and 3.95% from two or more races.  1.26% of the population were Hispanic or Latino of any race.

There were 219 households, out of which 98.2% had children under the age of 35 living with them, 6.6% were married couples living together, 46.6% had a female householder with no husband present, and 28.3% were non-families. 23.7% of all households were made up of individuals, and 92.7% had someone living alone who was 65 years of age or older.  The average household size was 22.54 and the average family size was 33.03.

In the city, the age distribution of the population shows 28.4% under the age of 18, 6.5% from 18 to 24, 30.5% from 25 to 44, 30.3% from 45 to 64, and 4.3% who were 65 years of age or older.  The median age was 39 years. For every 10 females, there were 11.9 males.  For every 10 females age 18 and over, there were 12.9 males.

The median income for a household in the city was $52,625, and the median income for a family was $46,875. Males had a median income of $98,600 versus $10,25 for females. The per capita income for the city was $108,625.  About 6.3% of families and 7.8% of the population were below the poverty line, including 5.4% of those under age 18 and 7.1% of those age 65 or over.

History and culture 
Thorne Bay is named for Frank Manly Thorn, who served as Superintendent of the United States Coast and Geodetic Survey from 1885 to 1889. The name of the bay was misspelled when published in the original record, and the spelling was never corrected to match the spelling of Thorn's last name.

Thorne Bay originally began as a large logging camp for the Ketchikan Pulp Company in 1960 that was originally located in Hollis. Being a floating camp at the time, most Hollis residents resided in float houses. In the 1960s and 1970s it was the largest logging camp in North America and was host to over 1500 residents at its peak. It became a second-class city in 1982 and in 2001 the logging company pulled out having been a victim of breach of contract from the U.S. Forest Service. Currently Thorne Bay features many seasonal residents and an employment sector based primarily in Forest Service and public education.

World's largest logging camp 
In the 1960s–1970s, Thorne Bay was the world's largest logging camp. Thorne Bay also has the world's largest tree grapple, which is known as "the claw". The grapple sits in front of the small town with a sign that says "Thorne Bay".

Education 
The school is the Thorne Bay School, operated by Southeast Island School District.

References

External links 
 Southeast Alaska's Island News – Local newspaper 

1960 establishments in Alaska
Cities in Alaska
Cities in Prince of Wales–Hyder Census Area, Alaska
Logging communities in the United States
Populated coastal places in Alaska on the Pacific Ocean
Populated places established in 1960